Vasum dominicense is an extinct species of medium to large sea snail, a marine gastropod mollusk in the family Turbinellidae.

Description
The height of the shell: 60.0 mm, its diameter 37.0 mm.

Distribution
Fossils of this marine species have been found in Pliocene strata of the Dominican Republic. (age range: 5.332 to 3.6 Ma)

References

 E. H. Vokes. 1998. Neogene Paleontology in the Northern Dominican Republic 18. The Superfamily Volutacea (in part) (Mollusca: Gastropoda). Bulletins of American Paleontology 113(354):1-54

External links
 Vokes, Emily H. "The age of the Baitoa Formation, Dominican Republic, using Mollusca for correlation." Tulane Studies in Geology and Paleontology 15.4 (1979): 105-116.

dominicense
Gastropods described in 1873